Zyuzino may refer to several places:
Zyuzino District, a district in South-Western Administrative Okrug of the federal city of Moscow, Russia
Zyuzino, Belarus, a settlement in Vitebsk Oblast, Belarus
Zyuzino, Russia, several rural localities in Russia
 Zyuzino (Moscow Metro)

See also
Zyuzin